HD 91190 is a suspected astrometric binary star system in the northern circumpolar constellation of Draco. It is faintly visible to the naked eye, having an apparent visual magnitude of 4.86. This system is moving further away from the Sun with a heliocentric radial velocity of  +17 km/s, having come to within  some 2.4 million years ago.

At the age of about two billion years, this is an evolved G-type giant star with a stellar classification of G8 III-IIIb. It has 2.39 times the mass of the Sun and is radiating 69 times the Sun's luminosity from its photosphere at an effective temperature of around 4,965 K.

References

G-type giants
Astrometric binaries
Draco (constellation)
Durchmusterung objects
091190
051808
4126